S. P. Varma (Jammu and Kashmir) is a social worker and a peace activist from Jammu and Kashmir who has made exemplary contribution by spreading the message of peace in trouble-torn areas of the Kashmir valley. He met Nirmala Deshpande, an eminent Gandhian, at Jammu in 1990. Inspired by her work and dedication, he left his government job (Civil Engineer) and dedicated himself to Gandhism.

He organised local communities for inter-faith meetings to re-establish the shattered trust in the Kashmir valley. He spread the movement to other disturbed areas of Doda, Udhampur, Rajouri and Poonch. The success achieved motivated him to gradually take the movement to other parts of the country especially in North East India and Naxalite hit areas of the country.

S. P. Varma organised National Integration Camps, Aman Melas, Peace Marches, All-faith prayers, Seminars, Conferences, Workshops, Gandhian quiz competitions and cultural-Sports events in various pockets of the State as well as country in collaboration with various agencies during 1990–2015.

He also became associated with Sunil Dutt, Union Minister and noted Bollywood actor in organizing and spearheading the work of Sadbhawana ke Sipahi in Jammu and Kashmir as chairman of the Jammu and Kashmir chapter.

In 2005 he led the Gandhi peace mission to Europe where he delivered lectures on implementing Gandhian ideology in Jammu and Kashmir.

He is active in peace padyatras and covered entire India to spread the message of peace, harmony, integration and creating awareness against social evils prevailing in the society.

In 2015, he introduced UN-GGF Peace Trophy under the name Gandhi Mandela Cricket Series for the special children of J&K State who lives in orphan homes.

In 2018, he collaborated Gandhi Global Family with Department of Higher Education, J&K Government and introduced the SDGs in all the colleges located in Jammu & Kashmir. Today over hundred thousands of youth of the State have come in direct touch with the SDGs. The purpose of such initiative is to enable the younger generation to join hands towards community welfare and thereby promoting global goals.

In 2020 & 2021, during the ongoing COVID-19 pandemic crisis, Dr S P Varma with the help of GGF volunteers formed GGF J&K Covid-19 Relief & Response Team in Jammu and Kashmir and has organized more than 350 Relief & Covid-19 Awareness camps and distributed grocery kits, immunity booster kits & hygiene kits to migrants and local needy families of Jammu and Kashmir. On 5 August 2020, Dr S P Varma reported Covid positive and was hospitalized along with 4 members of his family including three years old granddaughter Nmami Varma. From hospital, he announced to organize 150 relief camps in J&K as a perfect tribute to Mahatma Gandhi during his ongoing 150th birth anniversary year. After completing 150 camps on 2nd Oct 2020, he has continued the efforts in helping needy people by organising more relief & covid19 awareness camps in Jammu & Kashmir.

In 2012 Govt of India recognized his selfless services towards country with Padma Shri award.  
In 2017, De Montfort University, England has conferred Honorary Doctorate (D Lit) on him for his peace work in India.
Since 2016, he is the NGO delegate for Gandhi Global Family to UN Department of Global Communication (DGC), New York.

A brief description of his voluntary services towards the country 
Awareness programs:
 

Organizing Symposium on truth and non-violence in schools, colleges and universities of Jammu and Kashmir States from 1990 to 2015 and in this way a movement was established and the successful programme was extended on national level from 2010 with the help of Union Ministry of HRD.
Organised All India Gandhian Workers National Samelan in April 1997 at M.A. Stadium, Jammu in which over 25000 Gandhian Workers had participated from all parts of the country. The then Prime Minister Shri I.K. Gujral addressed the summit.
Presented Autobiographies of Mahatma Gandhi to over one lakh (100000) people in Jammu and Kashmir and provided complete sets of Autobiography of Mahatma Gandhi, in different languages, to hundreds of high dignitaries and thousands working on grass-root level.
Organised Jammu and Kashmir State Sadbhavana – Ke – Sipahi convention at Jammu on 20 January 2003 in which thousands of SKS volunteers from all over the state participated and which was addressed by Hon’ble Congress President Smt. Sonia Gandhi, and Jammu and Kashmir PCC President Jenab Ghulam Nabi Azad in the presence of Dr. Manmohan Singh Ji and Smt. Ambika Soni. Smt Sonia Gandhi presented "Rajiv Gandhi State Sadbhavana Awards" to outstanding individuals and organisations in appreciation of their work in the field of peace and harmony irrespective of political affiliation.
Launched "Bharat Jodo Abhiyan" in Srinagar in which thousands of Sadbhavana Ke Sipahi from the State remembered the supreme sacrifices of Mahatma Gandhi, Smt. Indira Gandhi and Sh. Rajiv Gandhi and pledged to work for unity and integrity of the country. The volunteers one each from every districts of the State were honoured by Jenab Ghulam Nabi Azad President PCC Jammu and Kashmir.
Organized various social awareness programs on Anti-Dowry system, Save the Girl Child, Drug abuse, gender equality, ecology literacy etc.
Celebrating National and International Days as per charter of GOI and UNO.

Remembering Freedom Fighters 
Identified and activated Veteran Gandhians and Freedom Fighters by recognizing their services publicly and utilizing their experiences for inculcating the sense of pride in being Indian amongst the younger generation.
Celebrating Gandhi Jayanti on 2 October at Srinagar (at SKICC, Rajbagh, and Sonawar) and observing Martyrs Day on 30 January at Dewan – e – Aam Mubarak Mandi Palace, Jammu for the last 23 years in which thousands of people from all districts and all shades of life participate for the last over 30 years on regular basis.
Celebrating Children Day on 14 November, the birthday of Jawaharlal Nehru for the last 23 years in Jammu / Srinagar. Nehru Youth Medals are also present on this day to the talented Youth, one per district for peace and harmony.
Observance of birth and death anniversaries of 80 front runner freedom fighters of our nation at various parts of the country.
Celebrating National festivals such as Independence Day, Republic Day, Gandhi Jayanti, Diwali, EID, Gurupurab, Christmas, Buddha Jayanti, Mahavir Janma Kalyanak together involving all faiths.

Padyatra and Parikrama around the country 
Organised Sadbhavana Padyatra led by Sh. Sunil Dutt Ji from Golden Temple Amritsar to Hazratbal Shrine Srinagar via Shri Mata Vaishno Devi Shrine in 2002.
Organised and participated in Padyatras with Didi Nirmala Deshpande and Sh Sunil Dutt for spreading the message of peace and harmony; and Sh. Sunder Lal Bahuguna for protection of green cover in various parts of country from 1990 to 2010.
Organising exposure trips for the thousands of Gandhian Workers from Jammu and Kashmir State to other parts of the country on regular basis to participate in Annual Conventions ever since 1992

Gandhians Parikrama for Peace 
Gandhians Parikrama around country for peace, harmony, integration and creating awareness against social evils prevailing in the society. Flagged off on 17 Oct 2010 onwards from Kanyakumari.

Phase I 
As Vice President Gandhi Global Family Coordinated Gandhian’s Parikrama around country from Kanyakumari to Kashmir led by young Gandhian Shri P. Maruthi of Chennai following South-Eastern Ghat and from Kashmir to Kanyakumari back following Central, Western Ghat from 17 Oct. 2010 – 1 January 2011 for complete 110 days to spread the message of Peace, Harmony and for creating awareness for eradication of Social evils and in militancy affected Jammu and Kashmir the Parikrama was led by myself from 7 – 21 Dec. 2010, visited 18 Districts out of total 22 covered a distance of 2800 km in 15 days Via Lakhanpur-Doda-Kishtwar-Bhaderwah-Ramban-Banihal-Qazigund-Kulgam- Ahrabal-Shopian- Pulwama-Pampore-Srinagar-Baramulla-Uri-Aman Sathu-Tangmarg-Budgam-Charara-e-Sharief-Hazratbal Shrine-Chatipadshai-Kheerbhawani, Ganderbal-Shankaracharia-GOC 15 Corps HQ Srinagar – Amar Singh College Srinagar-Anantnag-Udhampur-Katra-Shri Mata Vaishno Devi-Reasi-Kalakot- Rajouri-Poonch-Chake Da Bagh -Mendhar-Rajouri-Nowshera-Sunderbani-Akhnoor- Jammu Suchatgarh-Samba-Kathua and back Lakhanpur.

Phase II 
Started from Hyderabad, Bhubaneshwar, Siliguri, Guwahati, Dispur, Kohima, Imphal, Aizawl, Agartala, Shillong and Itanagar. Covering over thousands km to spread the message of Peace, Harmony and for creating awareness for eradication of Social evils.

Phase III 
Delhi-Chennai-Andaman-Nicobar Islands and back via Kolkata.

Final Phase IV 
This phase is scheduled to cover the remaining areas of the country in 2013, such as Sikkim, Bihar, Jharkhand, Goa, Diu-Daman, Dadar-Nagar Haveli, Lakshadweep Islands and Puducherry.

Institutionalized Gandhi Medals 

Institutionalized annual awards in the name of front runner freedom fighters, National and state heroes like Mahatma Gandhi, Pt. Jawaharlal Nehru, Maulana Abul Kalam Azad, Subhas Chandra Bose, Shaheed Bhagat Singh, Sardar Vallabhbhai Patel, Babu Jagjivan Ram, Dr. B.R. Ambedkar, Sh. Lal Bahadur Shastri, Smt. Indira Gandhi, Sant Vinoba Bhave, Baba Amte, Sh. Rajiv Gandhi, Swami Vivekananda, Nund Rishi, Habba Khatoon, Lal Ded, Baba Jitto, Raja Jamboo Lochan and Mian Dido to recognize selfless services rendered by individuals, institutions organisations, trusts etc., working in different fields to improve the living condition and social status of the weaker sections of the society, irrespective of their caste, colour, creed or sex.;
Decorated Army and Air force Chiefs with "Mahatma Gandhi Award" on 30 January 2006 at Jammu. The awards were presented by the former Chief Minister, Ghulam Nabi Azad for their commendable work during the earth – quake calamity in Jammu and Kashmir State.
Other esteemed dignitaries who are decorated with the Mahatma Gandhi Seva (Service) Medal are the Dalai Lama, then President of India Shri K R Narayanan, first lady Speaker of India Smt Meira Kumar, De Montfort University Vice Chancellor Leicester Prof Dominic Shellard, Director United Nations Information Centre for India and Bhutan Mrs Kiran Mehra Kerpelman.

Gandhi Global Family 
Gandhi Global Family is a United Nations DPI accredited NGO, founded to propagate ideology of Mahatma Gandhi, Martin Luther King Jr. and Nelson Mandela and to develop friendship at people’s level and establish people to people contact amongst different countries of the world. Presently Shri Ghulam Nabi Azad, former Union Minister, is its President. Where as Dr S. P. Varma is serving as J&K State President and Vice President Gandhi Global Family on honorary basis.

Global experiences 
Privileged to handle first delegation in Jammu and Kashmir State of Non – Resident Indians and Non-Resident Pakistanis settled in Europe, Canada and USA.
Headed Gandhian Peace Missions to foreign countries like Italy, France, Germany, the Netherlands, Belgium, Switzerland, Luxemburg, Bangkok and Pakistan and stress was laid on implementing Gandhian ideology for bringing world peace.
Attended one meeting each in UNO Geneva and European Union Brussels as a Gandhian Worker and delivered lecture on Implementing Gandhian Ideology in trouble torn Jammu and Kashmir.

Positions held 
Chairman, Sadbhavana Ke Sipahi, Jammu and Kashmir
President Harijan Sevak Sangh, Jammu and Kashmir State, founded by Mahatma Gandhiji in 1932.
President Gandhian Workers Society, Jammu and Kashmir State
All India General Secretary Akhil Bharat Rachnatmak Samaj, a Gandhian Society
Chairman Youth Hostels association of India, Jammu and Kashmir State branch; National Executive and Council member of Youth Hostels Association of India, New Delhi.
Commissioner, Bharat Scouts and Guides, Jammu and Kashmir
Treasurer Indian Red Cross Society Jammu
Chairman, Jammu and Kashmir Citizens Council
Coordinator Mahatma Gandhi Literature Campaign Committee Worldwide.
Coordinator Gandhi Doot Medal Committee Worldwide.
State President Gandhi Global Family, Jammu and Kashmir Chapter and Vice President Gandhi Global Family, New Delhi.
President / Advisor to 10 reputed Public Schools / Institutions in Jammu and Kashmir State.
Advisor, Jammu and Kashmir NGOs Federation, an umbrella organization of over hundred societies.
Executive Member, Savodaya Mandal, Sevagram.
Advisor Antim Jan Magazine published by Gandhi Smriti and Darshan Samiti, New Delhi

Awards 
Shri S.P.Varma is recipient of various honours and awards, prominently Padma Shri in 2012.

References 

1954 births
Indian civil engineers
Gandhians
Living people
People from Jammu (city)
Recipients of the Padma Shri in social work
Engineers from Jammu and Kashmir
Social workers from Jammu and Kashmir
Social workers
20th-century Indian engineers
20th-century Indian educational theorists